Clarence Veasey (Slats) Jordan (September 27, 1878 to December 7, 1953) was a  Major League Baseball first baseman and outfielder. Jordan played in one game in each season, going 0–3 in 1901, and going 0–4 in 1902. He batted and threw left-handed. He was signed as a free agent with the Orioles in 1901. In 1905, he played for the Agusta Tourists and was teammates with Ty Cobb.

Personal 
He was a Spanish American War veteran.

Jordan was born in Baltimore, Maryland, and died in Catonsville, Maryland.

References

External links

1878 births
1953 deaths
Baltimore Orioles (1901–02) players
Major League Baseball third basemen
Baseball players from Maryland
Meriden Silverites players
People from Catonsville, Maryland